Handball was contested at the 2005 West Asian Games in Doha, Qatar from 2 December to 9 December. All events took place at Al-Gharafa Indoor Hall.

Results

Preliminary round

Group A

Group B

Placement matches

Seventh place

Fifth place

Final round

Semifinals

Third place

Final

References
 Results

External links
Official website (archived)

2005 West Asian Games
West Asian Games
2005 West Asian Games
2005